Bastioides coxopunctata is a species of harvestmen in a monotypic genus in the family Sclerosomatidae from South America.

References

Harvestmen
Sclerosomatidae